Isaiah Jerome Green (born August 10, 1989) is an American professional gridiron football cornerback who is a free agent. After playing college football for Fresno State, he was signed by the Buffalo Bills as an undrafted free agent in 2012.

High school career
Green attended Long Beach Polytechnic High School. Green participated in the 2005 World Youth Championships in Africa, anchored the 4x100-meter relay team that won a Gold medal and was on the national high school record-setting 4x200 relay team.

College career
Green redshirted in 2007. Green recorded two tackles during the 2008 season. He made his first career start in the 2009 New Mexico Bowl. Green made five starts in 2010 and ten starts in 2011. He finished his college career with 46 games played, 16 starts, 94 tackles, one forced fumble and one interception.

Professional career
After going undrafted in the 2012 NFL Draft, Green signed with the Buffalo Bills as a free agent. After being released by the   Bills, the Indianapolis Colts signed Green to their practice squad on October 9, 2012. The Colts released Green on December 4. The Pittsburgh Steelers signed Green to their practice squad on December 12. He was released by the Steelers on August 30, 2014.

On October 14, 2014, Green signed a practice roster agreement with the Toronto Argonauts of the Canadian Football League. In one game with the Argonauts, Green recorded one defensive tackle & two special teams tackles. Green was released by the Argonauts on June 5, 2015.

References

External links
Fresno State bio
Toronto Argonauts bio

1989 births
Living people
Players of American football from Los Angeles
African-American players of Canadian football
American football cornerbacks
Canadian football defensive backs
American players of Canadian football
Fresno State Bulldogs football players
Pittsburgh Steelers players
Toronto Argonauts players
21st-century African-American sportspeople
20th-century African-American people
Players of Canadian football from Los Angeles
Long Beach Polytechnic High School alumni